Pedapalem is a village in Palnadu district of the Indian state of Andhra Pradesh. It is the headquarters of Atchampet mandal in Guntur revenue division. The village forms a part of Andhra Pradesh Capital Region and is under the jurisdiction of APCRDA.

Geography 

Governance 

Pedapalem Gram Panchayat is the local self-government of the village. There are wards, each represented by an elected ward member. The present sarpanch is vacant, elected by the ward members. The village is administered by the  Atchampet Mandal Parishad at the intermediate level of panchayat raj institutions.

Education 

As per the school information report for the academic year 2018–19, the village has a total of 5 Zilla/Mandal Parishad.

References 

Villages in Palnadu district